Ostearius melanopygius is a species of sheetweb spider in the family Linyphiidae. It is found in South America, and within a range from the Canary Islands to Egypt and Turkey, South Africa, China, and New Zealand. It has been introduced into Europe, as well.

References

Further reading

External links

 

Linyphiidae
Spiders described in 1879